James Black (1879–1948) was a Scottish minister. Originally ordained in the United Free Church of Scotland he became a minister of the Church of Scotland in the merge of 1929 and later served in its highest position, as Moderator of the General Assembly of the Church of Scotland in 1938/39 and was also Chaplain to King George VI in Scotland.

Life
He was born in Rothesay in 1879. He studied Divinity at Glasgow University and also studied at Marburg University. He was ordained into the United Free Church of Scotland in 1903 and began preaching at the Castle Hill Church in Forres.

In 1907 he transferred to the United Free Church on Broughton Place in Edinburgh. He then lived at 5 Inverleith Row. During this time he also served as an Army Chaplain in the First World War.

From 1921 he was minister of St George's West Church in Edinburgh replacing Rev Dr John Kelman. In 1929 the United Free Church re-merged with the Church of Scotland.

In 1938 he succeeded Very Rev Dugald MacFarlane as Moderator of the General Assembly and in 1939 was succeeded in turn by Very Rev Archibald Main. He was appointed Chaplain to the King in 1942.

He died in Edinburgh on 18 October 1948. He is buried with his wife in Dean Cemetery. The grave lies on the south side of the main path, near the entrance.

He was succeeded at St George's West by Rev Murdo Ewen Macdonald.

Family

His wife Florence died in 1923.

Publications
The Mystery of Preaching
The Burden of the Weeks
The Dilemma of Jesus
An apology for Rogues
The Days of my Autumn

He also contributed a regular article entitled "Dr Black's Corner" to the magazine "Christian World".

References

1879 births
1948 deaths
20th-century Ministers of the Church of Scotland
Moderators of the General Assembly of the Church of Scotland
Burials at the Dean Cemetery